The Nitwits is a 1935 American comedy film directed by George Stevens from a screenplay written by Fred Guiol and Al Boasberg, based on a story by Stuart Palmer. Released by RKO on June 7, 1935, the film stars the comedy duo of Wheeler & Woolsey (Bert Wheeler and Robert Woolsey), with featured roles being filled by Fred Keating, Betty Grable, Evelyn Brent and Erik Rhodes.

Fred Keating replaced Lionel Atwill, who later played the villain in the 1946 remake, Genius at Work.

Plot
Cigar-stand attendants Johnny (Wheeler) and Newton (Woolsey) get mixed up in a murder investigation at a radio station.

Cast
 Bert Wheeler as Johnny
 Robert Woolsey as Newton
 Fred Keating as William Darrell
 Betty Grable as Mary Roberts
 Evelyn Brent as Alice Lake
 Erik Rhodes as George Clark
 Hale Hamilton as Winfield Lake
 Charles C. Wilson as Police Captain Jennings
 Arthur Aylesworth as Lurch
 Willie Best as Sleepy
 Lew Kelly as J. Gabriel Hazel

Production
The film's original title was Mellodicks, which Lee Marcus, the producer, found repugnant. He offered $50 to any employee of RKO who could come up with a better title. While he received numerous suggestions, he finally settled on the picture's final title, which had been a generic title around the RKO lot for years.

References

External links
 
 
 
 

1935 films
RKO Pictures films
1935 comedy films
American black-and-white films
American comedy films
Films directed by George Stevens
1930s American films